The 2015 Best Footballer in Asia, given to the best football player in Asia as judged by a panel of 20 sports journalists, was awarded to Son Heung-min on 28 December 2015. Son became the first player to win the award on multiple occasions, and the first player to win the award consecutively.

Voting
The panel of jurors was constituted by 20 journalists. 16 journalists represent AFC countries/regions including Australia, China, Hong Kong, Japan, Korea Republic, Macao, Palestine, Qatar, Saudi Arabia, Tajikistan, Thailand,  Turkmenistan, United Arabic Emirates, Uzbekistan, Vietnam and 4 journalists represent media outlets of non- AFC countries/regions including England, France, Germany and Italy.

Rules
Each juror selects 5 best footballers and awards them 5, 4, 3, 2 points and 1 point respectively from their first choice to the fifth choice. The trophy of the Best Footballer in Asia is awarded to the player with the highest total of points.

Ranking

References 

2015
2015 awards
2015 in Asian football